"It's Not Just Me, It's Everybody" is a song by Weyes Blood, which serves as the lead single for her fifth studio album And in the Darkness, Hearts Aglow. The song was released on September 12, 2022, by Sub Pop. The song was written by Weyes Blood, Ben Babbitt and Jonathan Rado.

Style and reception 
Weyes Blood refers to the song as a "Buddhist anthem, ensconced in the interconnectivity of all beings, and the fraying of our social fabric." Musically, the track features swells of orchestral strings and harp from Mary Lattimore.

Rolling Stones Angie Martoccio called it a "dreamy six-minute" song "which opens with [the singer's] voice floating across the piano." BrooklynVegans Bill Pearis called the song "gorgeous". Pitchfork chose the song as the best new track of the week, with their writer Allison Hussey saying "Over a soft bed of piano and percussion, Natalie Mering makes a blunt observation about the human condition", highlighting the lyrics "We've all become strangers/Even to ourselves". Hussey notes that "As Mering repeats the title refrain", the said refrain acts as an "assertion that she's not the only one suffering [which] lingers alongside her own reminder that 'it's all a part of the same thing': Being good to one another won't fix the world as it is, but it can at least make each day a little more bearable."

Music video 
The music video for "It's Not Just Me, It's Everybody" was released on September 28, 2022. It was directed by Charlotte Ercoli and features Mering as the last person alive on Earth dancing amid debris and the dead.

Personnel 
 Natalie Mering – vocals, songwriter, producer
 Mary Lattimore – harp
 Ben Babbitt – producer, arranger
 Jonathan Rado – producer
 Drew Erickson – arranger
 Kenny Gilmore – mixing engineer
 Andrew Sarlo, Chad Gordon, Jacob Kell, Rias Reed, and Sean Cook – recording engineers

References

External links 
 
 

2022 singles
2022 songs
Songs written by Weyes Blood
Song recordings produced by Weyes Blood
Song recordings produced by Ben Babbitt
Song recordings produced by Jonathan Rado
Sub Pop singles